The 2008 European Taekwondo Championships were held in Rome, Italy. The event took place from April 10 to April 13, 2008.

Medal table

Men

Women

References

External links 
 European Taekwondo Union

European Taekwondo Championships
International sports competitions hosted by Italy
2008 in taekwondo
2008 in European sport
2008 in Italian sport